Schoenstein & Co. is the oldest and largest organ builder in the western United States. It was founded in 1877 by Felix F. Schoenstein in San Francisco.

The company has built organs throughout the United States and Canada, as well as repairing and renovating numerous organs, particularly after the San Francisco earthquake and fire of 1906.

Clients include the Boston Symphony Orchestra, the Eastman School of Music, the Kennedy Center, and the Washington National Cathedral.

The factory and archive is one of the few factories built for organ-building and is on the National Register of Historic Places, listed on November 14, 1978, as NRHP #78000759. The corporate office and main plant are in Benicia, northeast of San Francisco.

Among the notable Schoenstein organs is the organ of the Conference center of the Church of Jesus Christ of Latter-day Saints in Salt Lake City, Utah completed in 2003.

Gallery

References

External links

History on the company site

Musical instrument manufacturing companies of the United States
Pipe organ building companies
Manufacturing companies based in San Francisco
San Francisco Designated Landmarks